Savvas Poursaitidis (born 23 June 1976) is a former professional footballer who most recently was the manager of Cypriot First Division club APOEL.

Poursaitidis played football, mainly as a right back, in his native Greece from 1994 to 2002 before moving to Cyprus where his playing career continued for a further ten years. In 2009 he received Cypriot citizenship and represented that country at international level. In 2016, he began his senior managerial career, also in Cyprus.

Early life
Savvas Poursaitidis was born in Eleftheroupoli, in the Kavala district of Greece. He has a twin brother, Sakis, and his parents kept a taverna in Orfani.

Club career
Poursaitidis started his senior career at Doxa Drama. He also played for Veria, Olympiacos and Skoda Xanthi in Greece. Later, he moved to Cyprus to play for Digenis Morphou, Ethnikos Achna, Anorthosis and APOEL.

APOEL
APOEL signed Poursaitidis in June 2008, after the player was released from Anorthosis as a result from a failure in negotiations with his former club to renew his contract. In his first year with APOEL he continued to impress Cypriot football fans with his high level performances. In the end, he helped APOEL to be crowned champions after one unsuccessful season.

The next season (2009–10) Poursaitidis helped APOEL to achieve the greatest success in its history and reach the UEFA Champions League group stage. He appeared in five group stage matches with APOEL.

After he won the championship again in 2010–11 with APOEL, the Board of Directors renewed his contract, as they recognized that Poursaitidis was one of the key players that contributed greatly towards winning the Championship. 
 
In summer 2011, he appeared in nine 2011–12 UEFA Champions League matches for APOEL, in the club's surprising run to the quarter-finals of the competition.
  
In May 2012, Poursaitidis decided to retire from professional football, ending his four-year successful spell with the club.

International career
In August 2009 he gained Cypriot nationality and made his debut with Cyprus national team in March 2010 in a friendly match against Iceland. He made 12 appearances with the national team.

Scouting career
On 31 July 2012, after retiring from his football career, Poursaitides became Chief Scout in APOEL's newly created Scouting Department. On 7 June 2013, APOEL announced that the club were not renewing his contract.

Managerial career
Poursaitidis started his managerial career on 23 October 2016, when he was appointed as the manager of the Cypriot First Division side Anagennisi Deryneia. On 25 January 2017, after only three months in charge, he left the team to take over as the manager of Doxa Katokopias. On 30 April 2017 he left the team. He later became the manager of Nea Salamis Famagusta. He was appointed manager of APOEL in January 2021.
He was sacked in August 2021 after losing 4–0 against Pafos in the first match of the 2021-22 season.

Honours
Olympiacos
Superleague Greece: 1998–99, 1999–2000
Greek Cup: 1998–99

Anorthosis Famagusta
Cypriot First Division: 2004–05, 2007–08
Cypriot Cup: 2006–07
Cypriot Super Cup: 2007

APOEL
Cypriot First Division: 2008–09, 2010–11
Cypriot Super Cup: 2008, 2009, 2011

References

External links

1976 births
Living people
Greek footballers
Cypriot footballers
Cyprus international footballers
Greek Cypriot people
Olympiacos F.C. players
Veria F.C. players
Xanthi F.C. players
Digenis Akritas Morphou FC players
Ethnikos Achna FC players
Anorthosis Famagusta F.C. players
APOEL FC players
Expatriate footballers in Cyprus
Super League Greece players
Cypriot First Division players
Nea Salamis Famagusta FC managers
Association football defenders
Association football midfielders
Greek football managers
People from Kavala (regional unit)
Greek expatriate football managers
Footballers from Eastern Macedonia and Thrace